Direct presidential elections were held for the first time in Cape Verde on 17 February 1991, as previously the National Assembly had elected the President. The result was a victory for António Mascarenhas Monteiro of the Movement for Democracy, which had also won the parliamentary elections the previous month. He defeated incumbent Aristides Pereira of the African Party for the Independence of Cape Verde. Voter turnout was 61.4%.

Monteiro took office on 22 March.

Results

References

Cape Verde
Presidential elections in Cape Verde
1991 in Cape Verde
February 1991 events in Africa